The 2017 WEC 6 Hours of Mexico was an endurance sports car racing event held at the Autódromo Hermanos Rodríguez, Mexico on 1–3 September 2017. The Autódromo Hermanos Rodríguez round served as the fifth race of the 2017 FIA World Endurance Championship. The race was won by the No. 2 Porsche entered by Porsche Motorsport. The LMP1 grid for the race was reduced, due to the absence of the ByKolles Racing Team

Qualifying

Qualifying result
Pole position winners in each class are marked in bold.

Race

Race result
Class winners are denoted in bold.

References

External links 
 

Mexico
6 Hours of Mexico
6 Hours of Mexico
6 Hours of Mexico